The Clemson Tigers men's basketball and women's basketball programs are college basketball teams that represents Clemson University. Both teams play at the Division I level of the National Collegiate Athletics Association (NCAA).

The men's team has had 22 head coaches. Clemson started organized basketball with the nickname Tigers in 1912. The men's program has played in more than 2,500 games in 105 seasons. In those seasons, seven coaches have led the Tigers to at least one postseason tournament: Tates Locke, Bill Foster, Cliff Ellis, Rick Barnes, Larry Shyatt, Oliver Purnell, and Brad Brownell. Only one coach won a conference championship with the Tigers, Joe Davis in 1939. Cliff Ellis has had the longest tenure at Clemson, with 11 seasons; he is the all-time leader in games coached and wins.  Frank Dobson, who coached the team in its first two seasons, is the all-time leader in winning percentage. Statistically, Bud Saunders has been the least successful coach of the Tiger men, with a winning percentage of .162. The current men's coach is Brad Brownell, who was hired in 2010.

The women's program has had six head coaches. Clemson started an organized women's basketball program in 1975. The women have played in more than 1,000 games in a total of 36 seasons. In those seasons, three coaches have led the Tigers to at least one postseason tournament: Mary King, Annie Tribble, and Jim Davis. Davis is the only coach who has won conference championships with the Tigers. He is the all-time leader in games coached, wins and winning percentage. The current head coach is Amanda Butler.

Key

Coaches
Statistics are correct as of the end of the 2015–16 men's and women's college basketball season.

Men's

Women's

Notes

References
General

Specific

Head coaches
Clemson
Clemson
 
 
South Carolina sports-related lists